Panchakshari is a 2010 Indian Telugu-language fantasy film starring Anushka Shetty. It was directed by V. Samudra and released on 11 June 2010. It is dubbed in Kannada in same name, in Tamil as Panchamukhi and in Hindi as Vaishnavi.

Plot
Udayshankar Verma and his pregnant wife, Parvati, give birth to a baby girl near a temple of Goddess Durga in a rural village. The Priest names the child Panchakshari. Since she was born on a day and time considered auspicious to Goddess Durga, she is treated as a divine personality by the people of her village. She grows up to be revered by the villagers and is subsequently married to an orphan, Sriram/Rajesh Sharma. After some time the couple becomes parents to a baby girl and name her Reshmi. During the holy festival of Bonalu, Panchakshari is possessed by Goddess Durga, who predicts that Panchakshari is going to die suddenly. The prophecy comes true as Panchakshari is immediately engulfed by fire, shattering the villagers and rendering Reshmi unconscious.

While in the city, Sriram comes across Panchakshri's look-alike, Honey, an ultra modern city girl from a rich family. He follows her around, videotaping her movements, which earns the dislike of Honey. But she understands the truth behind his act when Sriram tells her about Panchakshari.  To make Reshmi gain her consciousness back, Sriram brings Honey to her. Honey visits the village, where she discovers that she and Panchakshari are actually cousins.

Later on, it is revealed that Panchakshari was killed in order to close and make people stay away from the temple to execute the villain's plan of digging the treasure. Honey goes to the Temple where Panchakshari died. Honey is possessed by Panchakshari, who scares the diggers away and paralyses the villain's wife. The villain's team try to get Panchakshari's spirit out of Honey's body with the help of an evil tantric sadhu, but fail. They also terrorise the villagers who pray to Goddess Durga to save them. Eventually the Goddess Herself comes into Panchakshari and kills the villain. The villagers rush to the spot to get the blessings of the Great Goddess. As she blesses everyone, she leaves the body of Panchakshari. And later, Panchakshari is out of Honey's body and her soul finally finds peace.

Cast

Anushka Shetty as Panchakshari / Honey (dual role)
Samrat Reddy as Sriram/Rajesh
Chandra Mohan as Panchakshari's father, Udayshankar Verma
Nassar as Vijayshankar Verma, Honey's father
Pradeep Rawat as Radeep/Billa Bhai
Jayavani as Billa Bhai's Wife
Brahmanandam as Kala Bhairava
Telangana Shakuntala as Honey's paternal aunt
Divyavani
Raghu Babu as Billa Bhai's henchman
Ravi Prakash 
Sudha
Fish Venkat
Banerjee
Jeeva
Stunt Silva
 Rajitha

Soundtrack
Music: S. Rajeshwara Rao (Chinna)

Telugu track list

Tamil track list

References

External links
 

2010s Telugu-language films
2010 films
Indian fantasy films
Indian ghost films
Hindu devotional films
Films directed by V. Samudra
2010 fantasy films